Vitali Madjar Synagogue is a synagogue in Cairo, Egypt. It is located on el-Missalah street off Ibrahim street in Heliopolis (Masr el-Gedida). It was erected in 1928.

Synagogues in Cairo